Union Township is one of seventeen townships in Adair County, Iowa, USA.  At the 2010 census, its population was 177.

History
Union Township was first settled in 1853.

Geography
According to the USGS, it contains three cemeteries: Hill of Zion, Liberty and Wilson.

References

External links
 US-Counties.com
 City-Data.com

Townships in Adair County, Iowa
Townships in Iowa
1853 establishments in Iowa
Populated places established in 1853